Disco Rigido is the debut studio album of Die Warzau, released on October 3, 1989 by Fiction and PolyGram. Van Christie claimed that the band wanted to integrate music that breaks racial barriers into compositions their audience could listen to us as much as dance.

Reception

AllMusic gave Disco Rigido a negative mark of two out of five possible stars. More positive in their critique of the album was Trouser Press, who identified Die Warzau's strength for combining rhythm and samples and claimed that "the group's political agenda never gets in the way of the fun." The album made CMJ's "Jackpot" picks in October 1989, claiming that "Die Warzau could be poised to fill the void on dancefloors" left behind after fellow Chicagoan Al Jourgenson "turned in his industrial-strength samplers and synth grooves for a sadomasochistic metal guitar crunch."

Track listing

Personnel
Adapted from the Disco Rigido liner notes.

Die Warzau
 Van Christie – guitar, synthesizer, sampler, computer, production, editing
 Jim Marcus – lead vocals, percussion, noises, production

Additional performers
 Stevo George – additional percussion (B5)
 Crystal Meth – vocals (B4)
 Mel Hammond – turntables
 The Hellfire Anti-Christian Choir – vocals (A2)
 Jesse Jackson – voice (B2)
 Jennifer Wilcox – additional vocals (A1, B1)

Production and design
 Tom Coyne – mastering
 Cy Price – additional engineering
 Dave Sears – additional engineering
 Steve Spapperi – production, engineering

Release history

References

External links 
 

1989 debut albums
Die Warzau albums
Fiction Records albums
Polydor Records albums
PolyGram albums